Jake Hanrahan (born 23 January 1990) is a British journalist and documentary filmmaker from the East Midlands. He reports on war and conflict, focusing on militia forces, paramilitaries and guerrilla warfare.

Hanrahan is best known for his work covering the Kurdistan Workers' Party (PKK), a Kurdish militant group, in southeast Turkey. He was arrested in September 2015 in Turkey with his colleagues Philip Pendlebury and Mohammed Rasool, after the three embedded with the PKK's youth wing, the YDG-H, who were actively fighting the Turkish Armed Forces. Hanrahan spent two weeks in several maximum security prisons in Turkey, including Diyarbakır Prison and Adana F-type prison, before being deported back to the UK. Hanrahan called on Turkey to release translator Mohammed Rasool, who remained in detention for over 100 days after Hanrahan's release.

Hanrahan has also reported on the War in Donbas, embedding with both the Ukrainian Ground Forces and the separatist forces in the Donbas. He has also covered wars in Syria, Iraq, and Palestine, as well as various riots across Europe.

Hanrahan runs a grassroots independent media platform called Popular Front, which consists of a podcast, documentaries and a magazine. His podcast has more than 150 episodes, interviewing people from conflict zones around the world. Popular Front's best known video project is the 2020 documentary Plastic Defence, which shows unique access to the man who invented secret 3D printed firearms in Europe. The documentary has amassed more than 2.6 million views on YouTube, and attracted much media attention.

Hanrahan has also worked as a reporter and a producer on VICE News and HBO documentaries.

Hanrahan's investigative reporting as part of Documenting Hate won a duPont Award in 2020.

In 2020, Hanrahan started the podcast "Q-Clearance: The Hunt for QAnon", aiming to clarify the origins and nature of the right wing political conspiracy theory QAnon.

References

External links
 Official website
 
 BBC News report about Turkey arrest
 Hanrahan's verified Twitter account
Popular Front website

1990 births
Living people
British journalists
British filmmakers
People deported from Turkey
Journalists imprisoned in Turkey